Hindsiclava rosenstielanus is a species of sea snail, a marine gastropod mollusk in the family Pseudomelatomidae, the turrids.

Description

Distribution
This marine species occurs off French Guiana

References

 Tippett, Donn L. "Two new gastropod species (Neogastropoda: Drilliidae, Turridae) from the western Atlantic Ocean." Nautilus 121.4 (2007): 210-213.

rosenstielanus
Gastropods described in 2007